100 Greatest Britons is a television series that was broadcast by the BBC in 2002. It was based on a television poll conducted to determine who the British people at that time considered the greatest Britons in history. The series included individual programmes featuring the top ten, with viewers having further opportunity to vote after each programme. It concluded with a debate and final determination of the ranking of the top ten. Although many living people were included among the top 100, all of the top ten were deceased.

Poll
The poll resulted in nominees including Guy Fawkes, who was executed because of his role in the plot to blow up the Parliament of England; Oliver Cromwell, who created a republican British state (the Commonwealth of England, Scotland, and Ireland); Richard III, suspected of murdering his nephews; James Connolly, an Irish nationalist and socialist who was executed by the Crown due to his part in the 1916 Easter Rising; Thomas Paine, who wrote against the British crown before and during the American Revolution; and a surprisingly high ranking of 17th for actor and singer Michael Crawford, the second-highest-ranked entertainer, after John Lennon. Diana, Princess of Wales, was judged to be a greater historical figure than Isaac Newton, William Shakespeare, and Charles Darwin by BBC respondents to the survey.

One of the more controversial figures to be included on the list was the occultist Aleister Crowley. His works had a direct influence on the rise in popular occultism and some forms of Neopaganism in the 20th century. In addition to the Britons, some notable non-British entrants were listed, including two Irish nationals, the philanthropic musicians Bono and Bob Geldof. The top 19 entries were people of English origin, though Sir Ernest Shackleton and Arthur Wellesley, 1st Duke of Wellington, were both born into Anglo-Irish families in what is now the Republic of Ireland when all of Ireland was part of the United Kingdom. The highest-placed Scottish entry was Alexander Fleming in 20th place, and the highest Welsh entry was Owain Glyndŵr in 23rd place. 

Sixty had lived in the 20th century. The highest-ranked living person was Margaret Thatcher, placed 16th. Ringo Starr was the only member of the Beatles not on the list. Isambard Kingdom Brunel occupied the top spot in the polls for some time thanks largely to "students from Brunel University who have been campaigning vigorously for the engineer for weeks." However, a late surge in the final week of voting put Churchill into first place. Of the top 100, only 13 were women, and only one entry was from the BAME community (Freddie Mercury).

Reaction of black Britons 

There were no black Britons voted on the list, prompting consternation from members of the black British community that their contribution and history in the United Kingdom were not being sufficiently recognised. A separate three-month survey was conducted among the public, resulting in the publication of 100 Great Black Britons, a list of the 100 greatest black Britons as judged by the British public. In 2004, two years after the 100 Greatest Britons list was voted on, social campaigner Patrick Vernon created a similar poll exclusively voted upon by members of the black British community, with Mary Seacole being named the greatest black Briton for her actions during the Crimean War with Russia.

The inclusion of Queen Philippa of Hainault on the list was criticised, as historians dispute that she was "black" in any modern sense. She was of predominantly European ancestry, with remote Armenian ancestry on her father's side, and Cuman (Turkic/Asian) ancestry on her mother's side. A report written by Bishop Walter de Stapledon in c.1319 describes either Philippa (then a child) or one of her sisters as "brown of skin all over", with hair "betwixt blue-black and brown"; but, aside from the confusion over who is being described, it is unclear precisely what these terms imply. All known portraits appear to show Philippa as white. Historian Kathryn Warner concludes that she was "a European woman and emphatically not of African ancestry".

The list
Although the BBC's original ranked list has been removed from their web server and what remains is only an alphabetical list of the Top 100, several other sources have preserved the original ranked list.

There was some question as to whether the Richard Burton listed at No. 96 was the actor or the explorer. A BBC press release makes clear that the actor was intended.

Top 10

See also
Greatest Britons spin-offs
Historical rankings of prime ministers of the United Kingdom
100 Great Black Britons

References

External links
 
 Churchill memorial press release
 BBC Great Britons press release
 BBC Great Britons book and links at National Portrait Gallery
 The Top 100 Great Britons – places 11 to 100 by rank — BBC (via web archive)

2002 British television series debuts
2002 British television series endings
BBC Television shows
Britain
Documentaries about historical events